Frank Pace Jr. (July 5, 1912January 8, 1988) was the 3rd United States Secretary of the Army and a business executive.

Biography

Pace was born in Little Rock, Arkansas, and attended The Hill School, Pottstown, Pennsylvania. In 1933 he graduated from Princeton University, and in 1936 from Harvard Law School.

Pace entered public service in 1936 as an assistant district attorney in Arkansas. He moved onto the Arkansas Revenue Department in 1938. In 1942 he was commissioned into the United States Army Air Forces as a second lieutenant where he served until 1945 in the Air Transport Command, Army Air Corps, reaching the rank of Major.

After leaving the Army in 1945 he returned to public service as an assistant to the United States Attorney General, then later as executive assistant to the Postmaster General.  He then moved in 1948 to the Bureau of the Budget, first as assistant director and then as director.

On April 12, 1950 he was appointed Secretary of the Army, where he served until January 20, 1953. In August 1950, to avert a threatened strike during the Korean War, President Truman ordered Pace to seize control of the nation's railroads.

He went on to serve as chief executive officer of General Dynamics Corporation from 1953 until 1962.  He was selected as the administrator-designate of the Emergency Transport Agency; part of a secret group created by President Eisenhower in 1958 that would serve in the event of a national emergency that became known as the Eisenhower Ten.

In 1964, Pace joined David Rockefeller to launch the International Executive Service Corps, which was established to help bring about prosperity and stability in developing nations through the growth of private enterprise.  Pace went on to serve as president of the IESC.

Pace was the first chairman of the Corporation for Public Broadcasting, from 1968 until 1972.

Pace appeared on the cover of Time magazine on January 20, 1958.

Pace worked for the International Executive Service Corps. In the early 1970s he worked for the first Executive Service Corps (ESC) as a Management Support Organization (MSO) in New York.

Pace died from a heart attack in Greenwich, Connecticut on January 8, 1988, at the age of 75.

See also

Pace-Finletter MOU 1952

References

External links
 

|-

1912 births
1988 deaths
20th-century American lawyers
United States Army Air Forces personnel of World War II
Arkansas lawyers
Businesspeople from Greenwich, Connecticut
Directors of the Office of Management and Budget
Harvard Law School alumni
Businesspeople from Little Rock, Arkansas
Military personnel from Little Rock, Arkansas
Princeton University alumni
The Hill School alumni
Truman administration personnel
United States Army Air Forces officers
United States Secretaries of the Army